John D. Johns (born February 8, 1952) was born in Gadsden, Alabama to J. D. and Margaret Griffin Johns. He graduated with honors in 1974 from the University of Alabama. Johns was a member of Phi Beta Kappa and Omicron Delta Kappa, and served as president of the Jasons Honor Society and Kappa Alpha. He then earned a dual juris doctor from Harvard Law School and master of business administration from Harvard Business School in 1978.

Johns joined the Protective Life Corporation in 1993 as Executive Vice President and CFO. He served as chairman, president and CEO of Protective Life Corporation from 2002 to 2017, and as executive chairman from 2017 to 2019. Earlier in his career, Johns served as General Counsel at Sonat and helped found Maynard Cooper & Gale, a law firm in Birmingham, Alabama. He was inducted into the Alabama Academy of Honor in late 2013, in part for his nine years of service to the Alabama Commission on Higher Education.

References

External links
 John D. Johns  Protective Life
 Protective CEO Johns among new Alabama Academy of Honor inductees
 #386 John D. Johns - Forbes.com
 Protective Life CEO Johnny Johns to become Executive Chairman, Rich Bielen tapped as CEO
 SEC Report 10.9.2019

1952 births
Living people
People from Gadsden, Alabama
Businesspeople from Birmingham, Alabama
People from Mountain Brook, Alabama
Harvard Business School alumni
Harvard Law School alumni
University of Alabama alumni